"Joanne" is a song written and performed by Michael Nesmith, his only hit song as a solo artist. The single was issued by RCA Records in mid 1970, from the album Magnetic South, the first album released by Nesmith and The First National Band after he left The Monkees. In the United States, the song peaked at No. 21 on the Billboard Top 100 on 3 October 1970. It went to No. 4 in Canada, No. 3 in Australia,
 and No. 1 in New Zealand. In the U.S., it was the most successful solo chart hit for any member of The Monkees.

"Joanne" was the second single issued from Magnetic South, following the release of "Little Red Rider" (which did not chart).  On the B-side of "Joanne", the track "One Rose" appears. RCA later reissued "Joanne" backed with "Silver Moon", as a single in its 45 rpm "Gold Standard Series".  "Silver Moon" was originally 
issued as a single from Nesmith's next album Loose Salute,  released in November, 1970.

"Joanne" was a staple on all of Nesmith's solo concert tours and has appeared on all three of his live albums: Live At The Palais, Live at the Britt Festival and Movies of the Mind.  Nesmith would also spoof Joanne on his home video, Elephant Parts, with the song Rodan.
 
The song was covered by Andy Williams on his 1970 album, The Andy Williams Show.

Personnel
 Michael Nesmith – vocals, rhythm guitar
 O.J. "Red" Rhodes – pedal steel guitar
 John Ware – drums
 John London – bass
 Earl P. Ball – piano

Chart history

Weekly charts

Year-end charts

References

1970 singles
Songs written by Michael Nesmith
Andy Williams songs
Number-one singles in New Zealand
Country rock songs
1970 songs
RCA Victor singles